Bob Hall may refer to:
Bob Hall (American motoring journalist)
Bob Hall (American political journalist), executive director of Democracy NC
Bob Hall (Australian rules footballer) (1908–1999), Australian rules footballer
Bob Hall (outfielder) (1878–1950), Major League Baseball infielder/outfielder
Bob Hall (pitcher) (1923–1983), Major League Baseball pitcher
Bob Hall (musician) (born 1942), English musician
Bob Hall (comics) (born 1944), comic book illustrator, co-creator of The West Coast Avengers
Bob Hall (ice hockey) (1899–1950), American ice hockey player
Bob Hall (New Brunswick politician), Canadian politician, member of the 50th New Brunswick Legislature
Bob Hall (politician) (born 1942), Texas state senator
Bob Hall (British journalist) (1945–2022), British sports journalist

See also
Robert Hall (disambiguation)